Xylosandrus is a genus of beetles with approximately 54 species globally. The type species is Xyleborus morigerus (Blandford) 1894.

Selected species
 Xylosandrus abruptoides (Schedl) 1955
 Xylosandrus abruptulus (Schedl) 1953
 Xylosandrus adherescens Schedl 1971
 Xylosandrus arquatus (Sampson) 1912
 Xylosandrus assequens Schedl 1971
 Xylosandrus ater (Eggers) 1923
 Xylosandrus borealis Nobuchi 1981
 Xylosandrus brevis (Eichhoff) 1877
 Xylosandrus butamali (Beeson) 1930
 Xylosandrus compactus (Eichhoff) 1875
 Xylosandrus corthyloides (Schedl) 1934
 Xylosandrus crassiusculus (Motschulsky) 1866
 Xylosandrus curtulus (Eichhoff) 1869
 Xylosandrus cylindrotomicus (Schedl) 1939
 Xylosandrus derupteterminatus (Schedl) 1951
 Xylosandrus deruptulus (Schedl) 1942
 Xylosandrus discolor (Blandford 1898)
 Xylosandrus diversepilosus (Eggers) 1941
 Xylosandrus eupatorii (Eggers) 1940
 Xylosandrus ferinus (Schedl) 1936
 Xylosandrus fijianus (Schedl) 1938
 Xylosandrus germanus (Blandford) 1894
 Xylosandrus gravidus (Blandford) 1898
 Xylosandrus hirsutipennis (Schedl) 1961
 Xylosandrus improcerus (Sampson) 1921
 Xylosandrus jaintianus (Schedl) 1967
 Xylosandrus laticeps (Wood) 1977
 Xylosandrus mancus (Blandford) 1898
 Xylosandrus mediocris (Schedl) 1942
 Xylosandrus mesuae (Eggers) 1930
 Xylosandrus metagermanus (Schedl) 1951
 Xylosandrus morigerus (Blandford) 1894
 Xylosandrus mutilatus (Blandford) 1894
 Xylosandrus nanus (Blandford) 1896
 Xylosandrus omissus (Schedl) 1961
 Xylosandrus oralis (Schedl) 1961
 Xylosandrus orbiculatus (Schedl) 1942
 Xylosandrus posticestriatus (Eggers) 1939
 Xylosandrus pseudosolidus (Schedl) 1936
 Xylosandrus pusillus (Schedl) 1961
 Xylosandrus pygmaeus (Eggers) 1940
 Xylosandrus retusus (Eichhoff) 1868
 Xylosandrus solidus (Eichhoff) 1868
 Xylosandrus squamulatus (Beaver) 1985
 Xylosandrus subsimiliformis (Eggers) 1939
 Xylosandrus subsimilis (Eggers) 1930
 Xylosandrus terminatis (Eggers) 1930
 Xylosandrus testudo (Eggers) 1939
 Xylosandrus ursa (Eggers) 1923
 Xylosandrus ursinus (Hagedorn) 1908
 Xylosandrus ursulus (Eggers) 1923
 Xylosandrus zimmermanni (Hopkins) 1915

References 

Curculionidae genera
Scolytinae